is a retired Nippon Professional Baseball pitcher. He spent his entire career at the Chunichi Dragons in Japan's Central League where he captured the Central League MVP award in 2011.

External links

Living people
1984 births
People from Chita, Aichi
Baseball people from Aichi Prefecture
Japanese expatriate baseball players in the Dominican Republic
Nippon Professional Baseball pitchers
Chunichi Dragons players
Nippon Professional Baseball MVP Award winners
Japanese baseball coaches
Nippon Professional Baseball coaches
Estrellas Orientales players